Liolaemus balerion is a species of lizard in the family  Liolaemidae. It is native to Argentina.

References

balerion
Reptiles described in 2019
Reptiles of Argentina
Taxa named by Andrés Sebastián Quinteros
Taxa named by Cristian Simón Abdala